Michael A. Cherry (born 1944) is a former justice of the Nevada Supreme Court. He was elected in 2006.

Education
Cherry did his undergraduate studies at the University of Missouri and graduated in 1966.  He earned his law degree from Washington University School of Law in 1969.

Career
Cherry began his career as a Deputy Clark County Public Defender.  He then became a partner at the law firm of Manos, Bailus, and Kelesis.

In 1981 he was appointed as Special Master of the MGM Grand Fire Litigation.  Two years later he assumed the duties of the Special Master of the Las Vegas Hilton Fire Litigation.  At both of these jobs he served as a liaison between the plaintiffs' attorneys, defense attorneys, and court.  The work he did as Special Master earned him recognition since he helped establish procedures which are now a part of mass disaster litigation.

In 1997 he was appointed to the Clark County Special Public Defender's Office to handle conflict and homicide cases. In 1998 Cherry was elected as a District Court Judge in Clark County.

In 2006 he was elected to the Nevada Supreme Court.  In 2012 he was reelected.  His term expired in January 2019. He served as chief justice from 20122013 and again from 20172018.

Cherry has said he will retire in January 2019.

References

|-

1944 births
21st-century American judges
Living people
Justices of the Nevada Supreme Court
People from the Las Vegas Valley
University of Missouri alumni
Washington University School of Law alumni
Chief Justices of the Nevada Supreme Court